Philotheca wonganensis, commonly known as Wongan philotheca,<ref name="environment">{{cite web |title=Approved Conservation Advice for Philotheca wonganensis (Wongan Philotheca) |url=http://www.environment.gov.au/biodiversity/threatened/species/pubs/64945-conservation-advice.pdf |publisher=Australian Government Department of the Environment |accessdate=15 August 2020}}</ref> is a species of flowering plant in the family Rutaceae and is endemic to the south-west of Western Australia. It is a shrub with thin, cylindrical leaves and white flowers with a pink central stripe, usually arranged singly in leaf axils.

The leaves are thin, scattered, needle-shaped, sometimes glandular-warty, and channelled on the upper surface. The ten stamens are free from each other and form a pyramid above the ovary.

Taxonomy and naming
This philotheca was first formally described in 1982 by Paul Wilson who gave it the name Eriostemon wonganensis and published the description in the journal Nuytsia from specimens collected by Kevin Kenneally near Wongan Hills township in 1980. In 1998, Wilson changed the name to Philotheca wonganensis in the same journal.

Distribution and habitatPhilotheca wonganensis grows in dense shrubland and woodland with a shrubby understorey. It is only known from four populations in the Shire of Wongan–Ballidu in the south-west of Western Australia.

Conservation status
This philotheca is classified as "endangered" under the Australian Government Environment Protection and Biodiversity Conservation Act 1999'' and as "Threatened Flora (Declared Rare Flora — Extant)" by the Department of Environment and Conservation (Western Australia). The main threat to the species is poor recruitment.

References

wonganensis
Endemic flora of Southwest Australia
Sapindales of Australia
Plants described in 1982
Taxa named by Paul G. Wilson
Avon Wheatbelt